Clostridium cavendishii is a Gram-positive, aerotolerant, anaerobic, spore-forming and motile hydrogen-producing bacterium from the genus Clostridium which has been isolated from contaminated groundwater in the United States.

References

 

Bacteria described in 2010
cavendishii